The 2003 Texas A&M Aggies football team represented Texas A&M University in the college football season of 2003.  The team's head football coach was Dennis Franchione. 2003 was the first year for Franchione who resigned from Alabama in late 2002. Franchione, known for his history of turning struggling football programs around, replaced R. C. Slocum who was fired after a mediocre 6–6 season in 2002.

Franchione brought the majority of his coaching staff with him to College Station. Strength and conditioning coach Ben Pollard declined an offer to go to College Station and elected to remain at Alabama. Franchione signed a contract that was set to pay him a yearly salary of US$1.7 million through 2010.

The Aggies finished the 2003 season with a 4–8 record, including a nationally televised 77–0 loss to Oklahoma, the worst loss in A&M's history. The season also marked the first losing season for the Aggies in 21 years.

Schedule

Game summaries

Arkansas State

Utah

Virginia Tech

Pittsburgh

Texas Tech

Baylor

Nebraska

Oklahoma State

Kansas

Oklahoma

Missouri

Texas

References

Texas AandM
Texas A&M Aggies football seasons
Texas AandM Aggies football